The Upper Svratka Highlands is a mountain range in Moravia, Czech Republic. The Highlands, together with the Křižanov Highlands threshold, form the Western-Moravian part of Moldanubian Zone – east south part of Bohemian Massif.

Geography
The Upper Svratka Highlands rise to the north of the Tišnov, Moravia between Lomnice u Tišnova, and the Svratka in the north.

The northwestern part is formed by Žďárské vrchy mountain range. To the southeast is the Boskovice Furrow in the mid-Moravian part of the Brno Highlands as well and in the east the Svitavy Uplands. The Svratka river stream naturally established Bohemian-Moravian border, the other part of Elbe–Danube main European watershed

The mountain range is 63% forested, though mainly by plantations - spruces, maples, beeches, elmeses. The forests are in well condition.

The primary composition of the range is cretaceous granite, migmatite, orthogneiss, amphibole, granodiorite, gabbro and quartz slate. Often gneis. 
Soil horizon – mainly cambisol.

The rivers Svratka,  among others, originate here.

Population
The area is relatively sparsely populated (in terms of the Czech Republic). The largest towns in the Upper Svratka Highlands are Nové Město na Moravě (partly), Bystřice nad Pernštejnem, Kunštát, Olešnice and Bystré.

Gallery

References

Further reading
 Geografický místopisný slovník, Academia, Praha, 1993. 

Mountain ranges of the Czech Republic
Moravia
Highlands